Stary Wołów  is a village in the administrative district of Gmina Wołów, within Wołów County, Lower Silesian Voivodeship, in south-western Poland. The earliest mention concerning the village dates from 13th century. Prior to 1945 it was in Germany.

References

Villages in Wołów County